Brubeck may refer to:

Dave Brubeck (1920–2012), American jazz musician
Howard Brubeck (1916-1993), American composer, brother of Dave Brubeck
Darius Brubeck (born 1947), American music educator, son of Dave Brubeck
Chris Brubeck (born 1951), American musician, son of Dave Brubeck
Matt Brubeck (born 1961), American musician, son of Dave Brubeck

See also
5079 Brubeck, an asteroid named after Dave Brubeck